The Reading Academy refers to the development teams of Reading Football Club. The club takes part in the Professional Development League system, with the Under-23 competing in the Premier League 2 – Division 2, and the Under-18 competing in the U18 Premier League – South Division.

Under the old youth training scheme, the club produced a number of first team players including Ady Williams, Scott Taylor and future England international Neil Webb. Since the Academy opened in 1999, 75 graduates have gone on to play first team football for Reading including Gylfi Sigurðsson, who was later sold for a club record transfer fee.

History 
Reading were granted Academy status by the Football Association in February 1999. The first Academy manager was John Stephenson who oversaw the club's youth development until October 2000 when he left to join Preston North End. He was succeeded by former Reading goalkeeper, and the then goalkeeping coach, Nick Hammond. After his appointment as Reading's first Director of football in September 2003, Hammond combined all three roles until the appointment of Exeter City boss Eamonn Dolan as the new Academy manager in October 2004. The club originally trained in rented facilities at Sonning Lane and Bradfield College but moved to their own training ground at Hogwood Park in Arborfield in 2004. A two-year Academy partnership with Boreham Wood was announced in July 2012 with the club also aiming to have a first-team composed of 50% Academy players. The introduction in 2012 of the four-tier academy system under the Elite Player Performance Plan (EPPP) forced the club to search for a new training ground in order to meet the criteria for Category One status. With this in mind, the club agreed in principle to buy land at Bearwood Lakes Golf Club for a new training facility at a cost of between £10 million and £20 million in May 2013. In July 2013, the club confirmed they had achieved Category One status.

The Reading reserves competed in the Capital League between 1995 and 1998 before joining The Football Combination which they played in from 1998 until 2006, excluding the 1999–2000 season. With the senior side's promotion to the Premier League in 2006, the reserve team was also promoted to the Premier Reserve League for the 2006–07 season. Under future first-team manager Brian McDermott, the reserves finished top of the Southern section and beat Bolton reserves 2–0 to win the overall title in their first season. They finished second the following year but were relegated as the first team dropped into the Championship. The reserves rejoined the Football Combination following their relegation and remained there until 2010 when they withdrew in order to arrange their own fixtures against a higher level of opposition.

With the club's application for Category One status under the EPPP, the under-21 and Academy (under-18) teams competed in the new Professional Development League 1 for the 2012–13 season. The teams were successful under the new format with the under-18s finishing as runners-up to Fulham in the inaugural competition, and the under-21s winning the first U21 Premier League Cup the following year.

In July 2022, Reading confirmed that their Academy had lost its Category One status as a result of downsizing during the 2020–21 and 2021–22 seasons due to the COVID-19 pandemic in the United Kingdom, and as a result the club the dropped out of the Premier League 2 Division 2 to the Professional Development League. The club also confirmed their intensions to return to a Category One Academy.

Under-23s 

The under-23s play their home matches at Hogwood Park, the club's training ground, with four games each season being played at the Madejski Stadium. Three outfield players and one goalkeeper over the age of 23 are allowed to be selected for each fixture, with scholars from the Academy squad also eligible to play.

Under-23 squad

Out on loan

Under-18 team 

Each year, following the completion of their full-time education, the club signs a number of schoolboys, from both within the academy and from other clubs, on scholarship agreements. The scholarships last two years after which the player signs professionally or is released by the club. In instances where a player is particularly valued, the club may opt to sign them on professional terms at an earlier age. The scholars make up the bulk of the Academy team which competes in the under-18 league, though younger players are also eligible. As well as the league, the Academy also enters a team into the FA Youth Cup.

The under-18s play their home matches at Hogwood Park, the club's training ground, with a selection of games each season being played at the Madejski Stadium. Three outfield players and one goalkeeper over the age of 18 are allowed to be selected for each fixture, with scholars from the Academy squad also eligible to play.

Current Under-18s squad

Out on loan

Staff 
Academy and development staff
Academy manager: Michael Gilkes
Assistant Academy Manager: Mehmet Ali
Professional Phase Coach: Scott Marshall
U23 Goalkeeper Coach: Robert Shay
U18 Coach: Michael Donaldson
U18 Assistant Coach: Mikele Leigertwood
Head of Academy Physiotherapy: Steve Cottrell
Lead Academy Doctor: Dr Marc Batista
U23 Academy Doctor: Manish Thakker
U18 Physiotherapist: Matt Flynn
U23 Physiotherapist: Cian Dunne
U9-16 Physiotherapist: Pippa Inwood
U9-16 Physiotherapist: Alex Meredith
U23 Sport Scientist: Harry Bruford
U18 Sport Scientist: Luca Avena
PDP Strength and Conditioning Coach: David Breakspear
U9-16 Sport Scientist: Callum Stratford
U18 Performance Analyst: Joe Cole
Academy Performance Coach: Ben Marks

Former players

Graduates 
Prior to the establishment of the Academy, Reading produced several players for the first-team who went on to have successful careers. Neil Webb became Reading's youngest ever goalscorer aged 17 years and 31 days and made a total of 81 appearances for the club, later going on to win 26 England caps. Ady Williams made nearly 400 appearances in three spells between 1988 and 2004 and was capped 13 times for Wales whilst Stuart Lovell made 227 league appearances, scored 58 times and played twice for the Australia national team. Others to have come through the ranks include Johnny Brooks, Jerry Williams, Steve Hetzke, Scott Taylor and Maurice Evans, who made over 400 league appearances for Reading and later managed the first-team between 1977 and 1984.

Since the Academy opened in 1999, 75 graduates have gone on to play for the first team. Players who have gone on to play for their country at full international level are marked in bold whilst those still at the club are marked in italics.

 Alex Haddow
 Darius Henderson
 Nathan Tyson
 Jamie Ashdown
 Darren Campbell
 Peter Castle
 Jamie Young
 Simon Cox
 Shane Long
 Curtis Osano
 Alex Pearce
 James Henry
 Julian Kelly
 Jem Karacan
 Gylfi Sigurðsson
 Simon Church
 Scott Davies
 Hal Robson-Kanu
 Nicholas Bignall
 Ben Hamer
 Jordan Obita
 Jake Taylor
 Alex McCarthy
 Lawson D'Ath
 Dominic Samuel
 Michael Hector
 Ryan Edwards
 Craig Tanner
 Jake Cooper
 Jack Stacey
 Aaron Kuhl
 Aaron Tshibola
 Sean Long
 Mikkel Andersen
 Niall Keown
 Andrija Novakovich
 Tariqe Fosu
 Josh Barrett
 Robert Dickie
 Tennai Watson
 Liam Kelly
 Omar Richards
 Axel Óskar Andrésson
 Andy Rinomhota
 Sam Smith
 Danny Loader
 Tom Holmes
 Tom McIntyre
 Gabriel Osho
 Ryan East
 Michael Olise
 Teddy Howe
 Akin Odimayo
 Andre Burley
 Jeriel Dorsett
 Ramarni Medford-Smith
 Ben House
 Luke Southwood
 Ethan Bristow
 Nahum Melvin-Lambert
 Dejan Tetek
 Lynford Sackey
 Nelson Abbey
 Oliver Pendlebury
 Conor Lawless
 Mamadi Camará
 Claudio Osorio
 Kian Leavy
 Kelvin Ehibhatiomhan
 Michael Stickland
 Jahmari Clarke
 Tyrell Ashcroft
 Louie Holzman
 Kelvin Abrefa
 Basil Tuma

Statistics

Careers elsewhere 

A number of players attached to the Academy as schoolboys and scholars, as well as those who signed professionally but never made a first team appearance, have gone on play league football elsewhere. Those that have gone on to play for their country at full international level are marked in bold and those who made their league debut whilst away on loan are marked in Italics.

 Jökull Andrésson
 Nick Arnold
 Charlie Austin
 Shandon Baptiste
 Marvin Bartley
 Abdulai Bell-Baggie
 Doug Bergqvist
 Kelvin Bossman
 Andre Boucaud
 Oliver Bozanic
 Henrik Breimyr
 Andre Burley
 Jamie Bynoe-Gittens
 Harry Cardwell
 Daniel Carr
 Harry Cooksley
 Donervon Daniels
 Kevin Danso
 Samúel Friðjónsson
 Tyler Frost
 Ben Gladwin
 John Goddard
 Tom Hateley 
 Jordan Holsgrove
 Jonny Hayes
 Noor Husin
 Dominic Hyam
 Uche Ikpeazu 
 Ji Dong-Won
 Zak Jules
 Clovis Kamdjo
 Ibrahim Kargbo Jr.
 George Legg
 Adam Liddle
 Adam Lockwood
 Angus MacDonald
 Jay Matete
 Carl McHugh
 Ramarni Medford-Smith
 Adam Mekki
 Stuart Moore
 Johnny Mullins
 Nam Tae-Hee
 Roberto Nditi
 Jack Nolan
 Akin Odimayo
 Hakeem Odoffin
 Matt Partridge
 Frankie Raymond
 Scott Rendell 
 Joel Rollinson
 James Rowe
 Conor Shaughnessy
 Chris Smith
 Louie Soares
 Matty Stevens
 Pierce Sweeney
 Rhys Tyler
 Gozie Ugwu
 Terence Vancooten
 Radoslav Vasilev 
 Bogdan Vaštšuk
 Connor Wickham
 Andy White

Records and honours 
Several Academy graduates hold club records. Peter Castle became the club's youngest ever player when he came on as a substitute against Watford on 30 April 2003 for his first and only Reading appearance, aged 16 years and 49 days, whilst Gylfi Sigurðsson holds the record for the highest transfer fee received when he moved to Hoffenheim in August 2010. In May 2013 Alex McCarthy became the first Reading graduate to be selected in the England squad since the Academy era began in 1999. Additionally, three graduates have been named Player of the Season with Gylfi Sigurðsson, Alex Pearce and Jordan Obita winning in 2009–10, 2011–12 and 2013–14 respectively.

The Football Combination
Winners: 2003–04, 2008–09
Runners-up: 2005–06
Premier Reserve League
Winners: 2006–07
Under-21 Premier League Cup
Winners: 2013–14
Under-18 Professional Development League 1
Runners-up: 2012–13

References

External links 
Under-21 homepage at Reading F.C.
Academy homepage at Reading F.C.

Reading F.C.
Football academies in England
Premier League International Cup
Great Western Suburban League